George Willie Schofield (6 August 1893 – ?) was an English footballer. His regular position was as a forward. He was born in Pontefract, West Yorkshire. He played for Manchester United, Southport Junior Football, and Crewe Alexandra.

External links
MUFCInfo.com profile

1893 births
Year of death missing
English footballers
Manchester United F.C. players
Crewe Alexandra F.C. players
Association football forwards